Newmill-on-Teviot, commonly called Newmill, is a hamlet in the Scottish Borders,  south of Hawick on the River Teviot.

The remains of Allanmouth Tower, a 16th-century tower house, lie to the south-east of the settlement.

References

Villages in the Scottish Borders